Povilas Juškevičius (born 5 February 2003) is a Lithuanian rower.

At the 2021 World Junior Championships, he won gold medal at the single sculls event.

References

External links

Lithuanian male rowers
2003 births
Living people
Place of birth missing (living people)